Gottfried Kägi (18 February 1911 – ?) was a Swiss skeleton racer who competed in the late 1940s. He finished fifth in the men's skeleton event at the 1948 Winter Olympics in St. Moritz.

References 

 1948 men's skeleton results
 Skeletonsport.com profile
 Wallechinsky, David (1984). "Skeleton (Cresta Run)". In The Complete Book of the Olympics: 1896 - 1980. New York: Penguin Books. p. 577.
 

1911 births
Year of death missing
Swiss male skeleton racers
Olympic skeleton racers of Switzerland
Skeleton racers at the 1948 Winter Olympics
20th-century Swiss people